Cyrtodactylus hikidai  is a species of gecko, a lizard in the family Gekkonidae. The species is endemic to the island of Natuna Besar in Indonesia.

Etymology
The specific name, hikidai, is in honor of Japanese herpetologist Tsutomu Hikida.

Description

References

Further reading
Riyanto A (2012). "Cyrtodactylus hikidai sp. nov. (Squamata: Gekkonidae): a new bent toed gecko from Mount Ranai, Bunguran island, Indonesia". Zootaxa 3583: 22–30. (Cyrtodactylus hikidai, new species).

Cyrtodactylus
Reptiles described in 2012
Taxa named by Awal Riyanto